Robert Knights (born 1942 in England) is a British film and television director, perhaps best known for his film The Dawning, about the Irish War of Independence. 

He has been nominated for three BAFTA TV Awards and he won the  Montréal World Film Festival Jury Prize for The Dawning.

Also the International Emmy in New York for 'Porterhouse Blue' (Channel 4) starring David Jason (BAFTA Best Actor Award), and Chistopher Gunning (BAFTA Best Music).

Selected filmography and television credits
The Glittering Prizes (1976)
The History Man (1981)
Porterhouse Blue (1987)
The Dawning (1988)
Double Vision (1992)
The Man Who Made Husbands Jealous (1997)
A Touch of Frost (1999–2000)
Waking the Dead (2001)
Monarch of the Glen (2002–2004)
Casualty (2007–2008)
The Bill (2002–2009)

References

External links
 

1941 births
English television directors
Living people
Film directors from London